Vector Direct was a direct response television company showing longform infomercials on the Freeview, Virgin Media cable service and Sky Digital platforms in the United Kingdom.

Sources 
Vector Direct Home Page

Television channels in the United Kingdom
Defunct television channels in the United Kingdom